Call and response is a form of interaction between a speaker and an audience in which the speaker's statements ("calls") are punctuated by responses from the listeners. This form is also used in music, where it falls under the general category of antiphony.

African cultures
In some African cultures, call-and-response is a widespread pattern of democratic participation—in public gatherings, in the discussion of civic affairs, in religious rituals, as well as in vocal and instrumental musical expression (see call and response in music). African bondsmen and bondswomen in the Americas continued this practice over the centuries in various forms of expression—in religious observance; public gatherings; even in children's rhymes; and, most notably, in music in its multiple forms: blues, gospel, rhythm and blues, soul, jazz, hip-hop and go-go. Many work songs sung on plantations by enslaved men and women also incorporate the call and response format. African-American Women Work Songs incorporate the call and response format, a format that fosters dialogue. In contemporary African-American worship services, where call and response is pervasive, a pastor will call out to his congregants to engage an enthusiastic response.  For example "Can I get an Amen?" or "Raise your hands and give Him praise!"

Call and response is derived from the historical African roots that served as the foundation for African American cultural traditions. The call and response format became a diasporic tradition, and it was part of Africans and African Americans creating a new, unique tradition in the United States. 

While slave masters encouraged conversion of slaves to Christianity, African slaves still practiced their own form of religious celebration, which was called Slave Christianity. But antiphony, a kind of call and response in Anglican worship, was also part of formal services in the South for centuries. African Americans put that tradition to their own use, as well as picking themes from Christianity that meant the most to them.

See also
 Marco Polo (game)
 Sea shanty

References 

African culture
African-American culture
Communication theory